Moffet is a municipality in northwestern Quebec, Canada, in the Témiscamingue Regional County Municipality. The municipality had a population of 206 as of the Canada 2021 Census.

Demographics
Population trend:
 Population in 2021: 206
 Population in 2016: 187
 Population in 2011: 196
 Population in 2006: 208
 Population in 2001: 234
 Population in 1996: 226
 Population in 1991: 246

Private dwellings occupied by usual residents: 104 (total dwellings: 179)

Mother tongue:
 English as first language: 7.1%
 French as first language: 87.7%
 English and French as first language: 2.4%
 Other as first language: 2.4%

See also
 List of municipalities in Quebec

References

External links 
 Moffet official Website

Municipalities in Quebec
Incorporated places in Abitibi-Témiscamingue
Témiscamingue Regional County Municipality